Seft is a village in Dastjerd Rural District, Khalajastan District, Qom County, Qom Province, Iran. At the 2005 census, its population was 67, in 25 families.

References 

Populated places in Qom Province